Sir Bhinod Bacha, CMG, is the former most senior Civil Servant (Secretary to Cabinet and Head of the Civil Service) of Mauritius.

He joined the Civil Service in 1968, working mainly at the Prime Minister's Office during Sir Seewoosagur Ramgoolam's and later Sir Anerood Jugnauth's terms in office as Prime Minister. By 1981 he had been promoted to Head of the Civil Service. He was also a board member of several para-statal bodies.

After the 2010 General Elections he was nominated as an Advisor at the Ministry of Land and Housing, but had to resign after the 2014 General Elections.

In February 2017, he was appointed as an Advisor at the Prime Minister's Office, soon after the resignation of Sir Anerood Jugnauth.

Controversies

Following the Quatre Bornes house fire on 6 June 1994 during which his wife Kathleen and son Lamesh died, Sir Bhinod Bacha and his companion Joyce Castellano were jailed and faced murder charges. However they were both acquitted in 1996.

Recognition

He was knighted in December 1991 during Queen Elizabeth II's 1992 New Year Honours, thus becoming one of the last Mauritians to receive a British honour as a few months later Mauritius became a republic in March 1992.

References 

Living people
Mauritian Knights Bachelor
People acquitted of murder
Year of birth missing (living people)